Elder Love Brewster was an early American settler, the son of Elder William Brewster and his wife, Mary Brewster. He traveled with his father, mother and brother, Wrestling, on the Mayflower reaching what became the Plymouth Colony in Massachusetts in 1620. Brewster had two sisters, Patience and Fear, and two brothers, Jonathan and Wrestling, along with an unnamed sister who died young. He was a founder of the town of Bridgewater, Plymouth County, Massachusetts.

Biography

Early life
Love Brewster was born at Leiden, Holland, circa 1611, although no birth records have been found, and died at Duxbury, Massachusetts, sometime between October 6, 1650, and the "last day" of January 1651. This latter date is based on the date of his will and when the inventory of his estate was taken. He was the son of Elder William Brewster, (ca. 1567 – April 10, 1644), the Pilgrim colonist leader and spiritual elder of the Plymouth Colony and his wife, Mary. At the age of nine, he traveled with his father, mother and brother, Wrestling, on the Mayflower to Plymouth, Massachusetts.

Marriage
He married Sarah Collier at Plymouth, Massachusetts, on May 15, 1634. Sarah was baptized on April 30, 1616, at St Olave's Church, in the parish of Southwark St Olave, an area of south-east London in the London Borough of Southwark, England, and died on April 26, 1691 at Duxbury, Massachusetts.  She was a daughter of Jane Clark and William Collier, one of the investors, or Merchant Adventurers, and an initial shareholder in the Plymouth Colony. She was the sister of Mary Collier, the wife of Thomas Prence, a co-founder of Eastham, Massachusetts, a political leader in both the Plymouth and Massachusetts Bay colonies, and governor of Plymouth (1634, 1638, and 1657–73). Thomas' first wife, Patience Brewster, was a sister of Love's. Sarah, Love's widow, married sometime after September 1, 1656, Richard Parke of Cambridge, Massachusetts, and he died there in 1665. He also gave her a life's interest in his estate, which was later sold to Thomas Parke in 1678.

Career
He was admitted a Freeman of the Colony on March 2, 1635/1636, which granted him the right to own land and to vote. Love and Sarah settled in Duxbury, Plymouth County, Massachusetts, around 1636/7 next door to his father. Love was a successful farmer through his adult life. He served in the Pequot War as a volunteer in 1637, and was a member of Captain Myles Standish's Duxbury Company in 1643. He served on the grand jury from Duxbury in 1648 and was one of the founders of Bridgewater, Massachusetts, although it is believed that he never lived there.

Death
He died about January 1650/1 in Duxbury, Massachusetts. Governor William Bradford reported that "Love lived till this year 1650 and dyed, & left 4 children, now living". He was probably buried in Duxbury, but his place of burial is unknown.

Children
Love Brewster and Sarah Collier had four children:
Sarah, born ca. 1635
Nathaniel, called "eldest son," born ca. 1637
William, born ca. 1645
Wrestling, died 1 January 1696/7, married Mary; eight children: 1) Mary (born 10 February 1678/9), 2) Sarah, 3) Abigail, 4) Jonathan, 5) Hannah, 6) Elizabeth, 7) Wrestling (born 4 August 1695), 8) John

Descendants
Love and Sarah's descendants number in the thousands today. Some of their notable descendants include:

Ralph Brewster Allison, M.D. (b. 1931), an American psychiatrist and a pioneer in Dissociative identity disorder (DID)
Roger Nash Baldwin (b. 1884), one of the founders of the American Civil Liberties Union (ACLU)
John Bartlett (b. 1820), an American writer and publisher whose best-known work was Bartlett's Familiar Quotations
Gamaliel Bradford (b. 1863), an American biographer, critic, poet, and dramatist
Benjamin Brewster (b. 1860), Episcopal Bishop of Maine and Missionary Bishop of Western Colorado
Benjamin Brewster (b. 1828), an American industrialist, financier, and one of the original trustees of Standard Oil
Dr.Chauncey Bunce Brewster (b. 1848), the fifth American Episcopal bishop of the Episcopal Diocese of Connecticut
David Brewster (b. 1939), American journalist.
Diane Brewster (b. 1931), an American television actress
John Brewster Jr. (b. 1766), a prolific, deaf, itinerant painter who produced many charming portraits of much of Maine's elite society of his time, especially their children
Oliver Brewster (b. 1708), who was married to Martha Wadsworth Brewster, a notable 18th-century American poet and writer. She is one of only four colonial women who published volumes of their verse before the American Revolution and was the first American-born woman to publish under her own name.
Ralph Owen Brewster (b. 1888), American politician from Maine; Republican U.S. Senator from Maine from 1941 until 1952
Bruce Dern (b. 1936), an Academy Award-nominated American film actor
Laura Dern (b. 1967), American actress, film director and producer
Alfred Ely (b. 1815), U.S. Representative from New York
Doris Humphrey, dancer and choreographer
Brewster Jennings (1898–1968), a founder and president of the Socony-Vacuum Oil Company, which in 1955 became the Standard Oil Company of New York (Socony), later becoming the Mobil Corporation.
George Trumbull Ladd (b. 1842), an American philosopher and psychologist
Henry Wadsworth Longfellow (b. 1807), American educator and poet
Archibald MacLeish (b. 1892), American poet, writer and Librarian of Congress. He is associated with the Modernist school of poetry. He received three Pulitzer Prizes for his work.
Admiral Samuel Eliot Morison (b. 1887), Pulitzer Prize-winning historian
Gaylord Brewster Noyce (b. 1926), one of the first Freedom Riders; arrested for trying to integrate the bus station lunch counter in Montgomery, Alabama
Robert Noyce (b. 1927), nicknamed "the Mayor of Silicon Valley"; inventor of the integrated circuit or microchip
Henry Farnham Perkins (b. 1877), American zoologist and eugenicist
Thomas Ruggles Pynchon Jr. (b. 1937), an American novelist based in New York City and noted for his dense and complex works of fiction. His best known novels are: V. (1963), The Crying of Lot 49 (1966), Gravity's Rainbow (1973), and Mason & Dixon (1997)
Matthew Laflin Rockwell (b. 1915), American architect, responsible for the site selection, plan and design of O'Hare International Airport
James (b. 1819) & Walter (b. 1822) Brewster, founders of the Village of Brewster, New York
Robert P. Shuler, American evangelist
William Allan Treichel, M.D.
Paget Brewster, American actress, best known for her role as Emily Prentiss on Criminal Minds.

Notes

References
Burt, Daniel S. The Chronology of American Literature: America's Literary Achievements from the Colonial Era to Modern Times New York: Houghton Mifflin Harcourt, 2004. 
Cottrell, Robert C. Roger Nash Baldwin and the American Civil Liberties Union New York: Columbia University Press, 2000 
Jones, Emma C. Brewster. The Brewster Genealogy, 1566–1907: a Record of the Descendants of William Brewster of the "Mayflower," ruling elder of the Pilgrim church which founded Plymouth Colony in 1620. New York: Grafton Press, 1908.
Lisle, Laurie. Westover: Giving Girls a Place of Their Own. Middletown: Wesleyan University Press, 2009. 
Longfellow, Henry Wadsworth. Evangeline, a Tale of Acadie: Issue 40 of Sesame booklets; BiblioBazaar, LLC, 2008. .
Merrick, Barbara Lambert. William Brewster of the Mayflower and His Descendants for Four Generations, Revised 3rd Edition, Barbara Lambert Merrick, compiler. General Society of Mayflower Descendants, 2000.
Merrick, Barbara Lambert. William Brewster of the Mayflower and the Fifth Generation Descendants of his son Love, Barbara Lambert Merrick, compiler. General Society of Mayflower Descendants, 2003.
Morgan, M.H. Daedalus: proceedings of the American Academy of Arts and Sciences, Volume 41 California: American Academy of Arts and Sciences, 1906.
Osborn, Norris Galpin. Men of mark in Connecticut: ideals of American life told in biographies and autobiographies of eminent living Americans, Volume 4. New York: W.R. Goodspeed, 1908.
Parks, Frank Sylvester. Genealogy of the Parke families of Massachusetts: including Richard Parke, of Cambridge, William Park, of Groton, and others. Higginson Book Co., 1909.
Schmidt, Gary D. A Passionate Usefulness: The Life and Literary Labors of Hannah Adams. University of Virginia Press, 2004. 
Wright, R.W. Biographical record: Yale University, Class of 1842. R.W. Wright, compiler. Tuttle, Morehouse & Taylor, 1878.

Further reading
Jones, Emma C. Brewster. The Brewster Genealogy, 1566–1907: a Record of the Descendants of William Brewster of the "Mayflower," ruling elder of the Pilgrim church which founded Plymouth Colony in 1620. New York: Grafton Press, 1908.
"Life Visits the Mayflower Descendants" Life November 29, 1948: 129–32. ISSN 0024-3019
 Sherwood, Mary B. Pilgrim: A Biography of William Brewster 1982.
"Will of Love Brewster" dated 6 October 1650 MayflowerHistory.com
Hillard, Rev. Elias Brewster. The Last Men of the Revolution. Barre, Mass: Barre Publishers, described with brief excerpts in Taylor, Maureen. "Ghosts of the Revolution", American Spirit (July/August 2003): 29–31.
Lisle, Laurie. Westover: Giving Girls a Place of Their Own. Middletown: Wesleyan University Press, 2009. 
History of the Mayflower 

1610s births
1650s deaths
People from Leiden
Mayflower passengers
American Congregationalists
17th-century English people
English separatists
People from Duxbury, Massachusetts
People from Plymouth, Massachusetts
Year of birth uncertain
Year of death unknown